Dizeh is a city in Kurdistan Province, Iran.

Dizeh may also refer to various places in Iran:
 Dizeh, Marand, East Azerbaijan Province
 Dizeh, Osku, East Azerbaijan Province
 Dizeh, Shabestar, East Azerbaijan Province
 Dizeh, Varzaqan, East Azerbaijan Province
 Dizeh Posht, Mazandaran Province
 Dizeh, Khoy, West Azerbaijan Province
 Dizeh, Naqadeh, West Azerbaijan Province
 Dizeh, Urmia, West Azerbaijan Province